This is a list of churches in the Free and Hanseatic City of Hamburg. There are many famous local churches in and around Hamburg. The St. Michaelis church is a famous Hamburg landmark, St. Nikolai church was the tallest building in the world in the 1870s and remains the second tallest structure in Hamburg.

List  

Legend
 
 

<li> Construction date or first mentioned on record., secondary dates are major events including fires and reconstruction but not additions.
<li> Borough or quarter of current political location.

See also 
List of museums and cultural institutions in Hamburg
List of castles in Hamburg

References

External links 

 
Churches
Ham
Hamburg